Philip David Ferns (born 12 September 1961) is an English former professional footballer who played as a left back in the Football League.

Blackpool
Liverpool-born Ferns signed for Sam Ellis's Blackpool, who were then in the Fourth Division, in the summer of 1983. His father, also called Phil, played 18 times for Liverpool F.C. in their 1963-64 title winning season. He made his debut for the Tangerines in the opening League game of the 1983-84 campaign, a single-goal victory over Reading at Bloomfield Road. He went on to make a further 36 starts and one substitute appearance.

The following season, 1984-85, he made six starts and two substitute appearances as Blackpool finished runners-up and won promotion to Division Three. His final appearance for the Seasiders came on 23 February, a 1–0 victory at home to Southend United.

After retiring from professional football, Ferns became a police officer with Hampshire Constabulary, and then later Dorset Police.

References

External links

1961 births
Living people
English footballers
Footballers from Liverpool
Association football fullbacks
Charlton Athletic F.C. players
AFC Bournemouth players
Wimbledon F.C. players
Blackpool F.C. players
Aldershot F.C. players
Yeovil Town F.C. players
Trowbridge Town F.C. players
English Football League players